Madame Élisabeth de France (1764–1794) is a  painting by Adélaïde Labille-Guiard. It is in the collection of the Metropolitan Museum of Art.

Description and interpretation
The work depicts Élisabeth of France, sister to Louis XVI, who lived in Montreuil. The painting was presented in 1787 at the Paris Salon of Painting and Sculpture.

References

Paintings in the collection of the Metropolitan Museum of Art